The Audi AI:RACE, codenamed the PB18 e-tron, is a 2-door hatchback electric sports car concept developed by a division of the German automaker Audi AG, Audi Sport GmbH and introduced in 2018. The name "PB18" refers to the 2018 Pebble Beach Automotive Week in Monterey, California, where the AI:RACE debuted. In January 2019, Audi confirmed that 50 examples will make their way to production within the next two years.

Specifications 
The AI:RACE is powered by 3 electric motors, 1 on the front axle and 2 on the rear axle, sending power to all 4 wheels. It supports conventional charging as well as Audi Wireless Charging (AWC) using a charging pad which can attach to the floor of a garage. Audi also claims a 0-62 mph (100 km/h) acceleration time of around 2 seconds. It also features an unconventional interior that allows the driver convert between a single-seater, central driving position and a conventional two-seater configuration with the driver on the left and a single fold down passenger seat on the right. This is made possible because the AI:RACE uses a drive by wire system, in which the main driving functions are controlled by the onboard computers. The AI:RACE provides 16.6 cubic feet of storage from its hatchback bodystyle. It also features 22 inch wheels, carbon disc brakes and adaptive magnetic ride shock absorbers.

Gallery

References

External links

Coupés
All-wheel-drive vehicles
Electric concept cars
Audi concept vehicles
Cars introduced in 2018